The Aam Aadmi Family is an Indian comedy-drama series directed by Apoorv Singh Karki. The series debuted on a YouTube channel called The Timeliners, which garnered 10 million views. The first series featured Lubna Salim, Gunjan Malhotra, Chandan Anand, Kamlesh Gill, and Brijendra Kala. The Timeliners have released 3 seasons.

Plot
Aam Aadmi Family is the story of a middle-class family, which features Sharma (Brijendra Kala) as the father, Madhu (Lubna Salim) as the mother, Bobby (Chandan Anand) as the naughty son, and Sonu (Gunjan Malhotra), their daughter being the sweetheart of the family. Daadi, played by Kamlesh Gill, is the notorious child of the house.

Cast
 Gunjan Malhotra as Bhavya "Sonu" Sharma 
 Chandan Anand as Bobby
 Kamlesh Gill as Daadi
 Brijendra Kala as Mr. Satendra Sharma 
 Lubna Salim as Mrs. Madhu Sharma

References

External links
 

Indian web series
Hindi-language web series
2016 web series debuts
YouTube original programming
TVF Play Shows
2010s YouTube series